Tobias Brodtkorb "Bias" Bernhoft (13 October 1902 – 24 November 1986) was a Norwegian singer and revue writer.

Early and personal life
He was born at Voss in 1902 to the Holmenkolbanen director Tobias Bernhoft (1869–1937) and his wife Marie Holmboe (1877–1974). He married Margit Haug (1908–98), a daughter of the hotel director Petter Haug (1875–1939) and Dorthea Olava Olsen (1878–1962). Bernhoft had two children with her, Unni Elisabeth Bernhoft (born on 4 March 1933) and Inger Marie Bernhoft (born on 29 January 1938). Unni Elisabeth Bernhoft married Bjørn Sand, and made her debut at Chat Noir in 1953.

Career
Bernhoft made his debut in the revue "Hvisk det Høyt" at the theatre Casino in 1926 in Oslo. Two years later, he opened a tobacco shop at Majorstuen. In 1930, he made his debut as a gramophone singer, singing the song "En bølgesang i solnedgang/Don Juan". Until 1938, Bernhoft recorded more than 40 records for the Columbia Records.

From the 1930s, he was a central writer for the revue stages Chat Noir and Edderkoppen Theatre, where he wrote revue texts for actors such as Lalla Carlsen, Leif Juster and Kari Diesen. Among his songs are "Omatt og omatt" (performed by Elisabeth Granneman), and "Karl Johan og jeg", issued on the album Jeg har mitt hjerte i Oslo, which became a radio hit in Norway in 1979.

Together with Bjørn Sand, Bernhoft wrote a famous monologue titled "Uteliggerne", which was performed by Kari Diesen. He was awarded the Leonard Statuette in 1973. He retired later in the 1970s, and died in November 1986.

References

1902 births
1986 deaths
Musicians from Voss
Norwegian songwriters
Leonard Statuette winners
20th-century Norwegian male singers
20th-century Norwegian singers